Colobothea fasciatipennis is a species of beetle in the family Cerambycidae. It was described by Linsley in 1935. It is known from Honduras and Panama.

References

fasciatipennis
Beetles described in 1935